"Thunder" is a song by American pop rock band Boys Like Girls. It was released on May 6, 2008, as the third and final single from their debut album, Boys Like Girls (2006). There are two versions of the song: one version where Martin Johnson sings alone and another version where Bryan Donahue sings some lines and backup vocals.

This song was released as an acoustic version first before it appeared on Boys Like Girls, and over two years before the song's official single release. The band first posted the radio remix of the song on their Myspace profile on March 11, 2008. It was the first song Boys Like Girls ever wrote which was written about Martin's high school sweetheart. Despite its poor performance in charts compared to their previous singles, it was certified Gold by RIAA the same week "Hero/Heroine" went Gold.

Music video
The music video for "Thunder", which was released on June 20, 2008, and premiered on FNMTV, shows a group of friends, which includes couples hanging out. The music video starts with the band playing before moving on to a group of friends along with the band members going to a restaurant to eat and commencing a food fight, with intervals of the band playing. The friends then go a field, where they drink and laugh, and then unsuccessfully attempt a human pyramid. The couples start hanging out alone and making out. From this point on, the band is shown playing in the rain. The friends are then shown going to a swimming pool and start swimming, with a couple making out underwater. They then run through a carpark and stand by the railings to see the sunrise. The couples are then making out again, and the music video ends with the band leaving their instruments.

The video was shot in many different locations throughout Cerritos, California, a suburb in southeast Los Angeles county, which include: the Tall Mouse Crafts store off South Street and Carmenita Road, Jack's Restaurant on Carmenita and South Street, Cerritos Park East Park/Rec Center off Ironbark Drive and 166th Street, Cerritos Park East Swim Center off 166th Street and Carmenita, and a commercial parking structure off Towne Center Drive and Park Plaza Drive near the Cerritos Towne Center and across the street from the Cerritos Millennium Library.

The main location where the band is seen playing in the street is Droxford St. and Pinewood Circle, a cul-de-sac in Cerritos.

Track listing
 "Thunder" (album version) – 3:57
 "Thunder" (radio mix/single version) – 3:57
 "Thunder" (acoustic version) – 4:02

Personnel
 Martin Johnson – lead vocals, rhythm guitar
 Paul DiGiovanni – lead guitar, backing vocals
 Bryan Donahue – bass guitar, backing vocals
 John Keefe – drums, percussion

Charts

Certifications

References

External links
 
 Upcoming Tour Dates
 Boys Like Girls Home-page
 Review of 'Thunder' Contactmusic.com
 Review of 'Thunder' on Culturedeluxe.com
 Review of 'Thunder on Absolutepunk.com

2006 songs
2008 singles
Boys Like Girls songs
Columbia Records singles
Rock ballads
Songs written by Martin Johnson (musician)

ko:Thunder (보이스 라이크 걸스의 노래)